Gormley is a surname of Irish origin. It may also refer to:

 Tad Gormley Stadium, New Orleans, Louisiana
 Gormley, Ontario, a community in York Region, Ontario, Canada
 Gormley GO Station, a commuter rail station operated by GO Transit in the neighbourhood
 Gormley, West Virginia
 Gormley (horse) (born 2014), thoroughbred racehorse